New North Klang Straits Bypass (NNKSB) or Shapadu Highway (/) (Malay: Lebuhraya Pintas Selat Klang Utara Baru or Lebuhraya Shapadu) is an expressway in Klang, Selangor, Malaysia. The  expressway also acts as the North Klang Straits Bypass (Federal Route 20) to avoid the accident-prone area on this road.

Route background
The Kilometre Zero of the expressway is located at Northport Interchange near Port Klang.

History
Lebuhraya Shapadu Sdn Bhd (LSSB) (a member of the Shapadu Corporation Sdn Bhd) was awarded the highway concession by the government on 1 August 1995 to construct, maintain and operate the NNKSB. The total project including land acquisition cost an estimated RM 536 million. The expressway, with a paid-up capital of RM 20 million, is a  two-lane dual carriageway, linking Port Klang to Klang town. Once completed, it will be a catalyst to the surrounding infrastructural development and development of Port Klang. This highway is equipped with a Traffic Surveillance System (TSS) and a Rest and Service Area in Kapar.

On 2014, the expressway was taken over to Grand Saga, a subsidiary of LGB Group which changes its name to Grand Sepadu Sdn Bhd.

Toll rates
The New North Klang Straits Bypass uses opened toll systems. Since 1 June 2016, all toll transactions have been conducted electronically using SmartTAG or Touch n' Go cards.

Kapar Toll Plaza (Bukit Raja - Port Klang bound)

Bukit Raja Toll Plaza

Bukit Raja - Kapar bound

Kapar - Port Klang bound

List of interchange and rest and service areas

See also
  North Klang Straits Bypass

External links
 Shapadu

1998 establishments in Malaysia
Expressways in Malaysia
Expressways and highways in the Klang Valley